Spectacle Lake is a lake northeast of Stratford, New York. Fish species present in the lake are chain pickerel, black bullhead, yellow perch, and pumpkinseed sunfish. There is carry down access via trail off NY-10 and a second off NY-29A. The largest island has a primitive campsite on it.

References

Lakes of New York (state)
Lakes of Fulton County, New York
Lakes of Hamilton County, New York